The Longma Dam is a concrete-face rock-fill dam on the Lixian River in Mojiang Hani Autonomous County, Pu'er City, Yunnan Province, China. The primary purpose of the dam is hydroelectric power generation and it is the fourth of seven dams in the Lixian River Project. It supports a 240 MW power station. Construction on the dam began on 23 December 2003 and the reservoir began to impound 20 July 2005. In July 2007, the first generator was commissioned and the last two were in December 2007. The project was complete in June 2008 at a cost of US$332 million.

See also 

 List of dams and reservoirs in China
 List of major power stations in Yunnan

References

External links 
 

Dams in China
Hydroelectric power stations in Yunnan
Concrete-face rock-fill dams
Dams completed in 2007
Dams on the Black River (Asia)
Buildings and structures in Pu'er